= Speed limits in Morocco =

The general speed limits in Morocco are:

60 km/h within urban areas.

100 km/h outside urban areas including expressways (voie express).

120 km/h on highways (Autoroute).
